Eudesme virescens is a species of alga belonging to the family Chordariaceae.

It is native to Europe and America, Greenland.

References

Chordariaceae